The 1975 Richmond Spiders football team was an American football team that represented the University of Richmond as a member of the Southern Conference (SoCon) during the 1975 NCAA Division I football season. In their second year under head coach Jim Tait, the team compiled an overall record of 5–6 with a mark of 5–1 in conference play, placing first in the SoCon.

Schedule

References

Richmond
Richmond Spiders football seasons
Southern Conference football champion seasons
Richmond Spiders football